Genista lydia, Lydian broom, dwarf broom, or common woadwaxen (a name it shares with Genista tinctoria), is a species in the genus Genista, native to the Balkans, Turkey and Syria. It has gained the Royal Horticultural Society's Award of Garden Merit.

References

lydia
Plants described in 1843